Hedcut is a term referring to a style of drawing, associated with The Wall Street Journal half-column portrait illustrations.  They use the stipple method of many small dots and the hatching method of small lines to create an image, and are designed to emulate the look of woodcuts from old-style newspapers, and engravings on certificates and currency. The phonetic spelling of "hed" may be based on newspapers' use of the term hed for "headline."

The Wall Street Journal adopted the current form of this portraiture in 1979 when freelance artist Kevin Sprouls approached the paper with some ink dot illustrations he had created. The front page editor felt that the drawings complemented the paper's classical feeling and gave it a sense of stability. Additionally, they are generally more legible than photographs of the same size would be. Sprouls was subsequently hired as a staff illustrator and remained there until 1987. Today, there are five hedcut artists employed by The Wall Street Journal.

Each drawing takes between three and five hours to produce. First, a high quality photograph must be obtained. This photograph is then converted to grayscale and the contrast is adjusted in Photoshop. The altered photograph is printed out, placed on a light table, and overlaid with tracing vellum. The illustrators then trace directly over this image with ink pens, recreating the source photo using specific dot and line patterns. The final tracing is then scanned back into Photoshop where it can be colorized if needed or otherwise adjusted. These drawings are traditionally created at 18 by 31 picas, and then later reduced to fit the column size. Women are sometimes more difficult to depict than men as they tend to have more complicated haircuts, which are often cropped for simplicity. This allows the women's portraits to fit into the same size frame as the men's without reducing the relative scale of the women's faces.

In 2002 the Smithsonian Institution acquired 66 original hedcut drawings and have put them on permanent display in the National Portrait Gallery.

A March 18, 2010 video produced by The Wall Street Journal shows the artists at work.

In 2019 The Wall Street Journal began developing a proprietary application that generated custom hedcut portraits using machine learning. In December 2019 the news organization began offering the service to all of its members in order to "democratize" the illustrations and create an ongoing repository of photos for the app to continue to learn from in order to better refine its results.

References

External links
 History of WSJ Hedcuts—Article on the artists and history behind the WSJ hedcut portraits
 Smithsonian National Portrait Gallery—exhibit "Picturing Business in America:  Hedcuts in the Wall Street Journal"
 Kevin Sprouls Blog—Blog showcasing art of Kevin Sprouls, originator of the Hedcut portrait style
 Square Gear Gimp Tips - Hedcut—Gimp tutorial and equivalent Gimp script
Illustration
The Wall Street Journal